Despite the Night (original title:  Malgré la nuit) is a 2015 French-Canadian experimental film directed by Philippe Grandrieux.

Cast 
 Kristian Marr as Lenz
 Ariane Labed as Hélène
 Roxane Mesquida as Lena
 Paul Hamy as Louis
 Johan Leysen as Vitali
 Sam Louwyck as The man with metallic voice
 Aurélien Recoing as Paul
 Gabrielle Lazure as The mother
 Lola Norda as Lola

Release 
The film premiered at the Festival du nouveau cinéma in October 2015. It was screened at the AFI Fest in November 2016.

References

External links 
 
 on Despite the Night on Framative (Persian)

2015 films
2015 drama films
Films about pornography
French avant-garde and experimental films
French drama films
2010s avant-garde and experimental films
Canadian avant-garde and experimental films
Canadian drama films
French-language Canadian films
2010s English-language films
2010s Canadian films
2010s French films